The Man is a 1972 American political drama film directed by Joseph Sargent and starring James Earl Jones. Jones plays Douglass Dilman, the President pro tempore of the United States Senate, who succeeds to the presidency through a series of unforeseeable events, thereby becoming both the first African-American president and the first wholly unelected one. The screenplay, written by Rod Serling, is largely based upon The Man, a novel by Irving Wallace.

In addition to being the first black president more than thirty-six years before the real-world occurrence, the fictional Dilman was also the first president elected to neither that office nor to the Vice Presidency, foreshadowing the real-world elevation of Gerald Ford by less than twenty-five months.

In an interview with Greg Braxton of the Los Angeles Times that ran January 16, 2009, four days before Barack Obama was inaugurated as president, Jones was asked about having portrayed the fictional first black U.S. president on film. He replied: "I have misgivings about that one. It was done as a TV special. Had we known it was to be released as a motion picture, we would have asked for more time and more production money. I regret that."

Plot
President Fenton and the Speaker of the United States House of Representatives are killed at a summit in Frankfurt, West Germany when the palace hosting the legation collapses. By law the serving President upon the death of the elected one, Vice President Noah Calvin is suffering from a terminal condition and refuses to assume the office.

Arthur Eaton, the Secretary of State, corrects the popular assumption that he is the next in the line of succession, explaining that it had been amended by the Presidential Succession Act of 1947, and that the next successor is the President pro tempore of the United States Senate, who is Douglass Dilman. Dilman, a black man, is sworn in and arrives at the White House to assume office. Eaton's outspoken wife, Kay, berates her husband for not pushing to become President, even though it would violate the succession order. Eaton assures her that he will become President once Dilman proves unable to handle the job.

In the morning, Eaton and his advisers arrive at the Oval Office and Eaton begins maneuvering himself into a position as the "power behind the throne". Eaton gives Dilman a binder of briefing notes, including responses to news media questions that support the positions of the Fenton administration.

Dilman meets the press for the first time as President. He initially follows Eaton's instructions. When Dilman stops to consult notes after each question, an aggressive reporter accuses Dilman of being a puppet. Eaton scribbles a note and has it taken forward to the president. Dilman realizes that he's being manipulated, crumples Eaton's note, and shoves the briefing binder aside. He proceeds under his own initiative, deciding that as President he will have to make his own decisions.

Dilman, a political moderate, is confronted by both activists and extremists about his skin color. Robert Wheeler (Georg Stanford Brown), a young black man, is sought for extradition by South Africa for an attempt to assassinate the defence minister of that country; Dilman offers his help when the young man claims he was in Burundi at the time of the assassination attempt.

Senator Watson introduces a bill that would require Congressional approval of any dismissal of a cabinet member by the president. Eaton doesn't tell Dilman about it, but several black congressmen have a meeting with Dilman to discuss their concerns. Dilman believes they are talking about a minority rights bill and pledges his support, until one of the congressmen corrects him. Dilman subsequently reprimands Eaton and a group of senior leaders, questioning why such an important bill is not being brought to his attention.

Senator Watson visits the South African embassy. The ambassador comments that his own country would never have a black man as president. He shows a news film to Watson that proves Wheeler was in South Africa during the assassination attempt. The scandal threatens Dilman's presidency. Dilman obtains Wheeler's confession and hands him over for extradition. The act alienates his activist adult daughter, Wanda. Wheeler calls the president a "house nigger"; the president responds that: "black men don't burn churches and kill four children; they don't hunt down a Martin Luther King with a telescopic sight. Passion may drive you to the streets to throw a brick, but to buy a gun, plant an alibi and travel 5000 miles and kill a human being is bloodless, worthy of the selective morality of Adolf Eichmann."

The president addresses reporters at the governing party's National Convention, where Eaton is now openly challenging Dilman for the presidential nomination, with Watson's support. Dilman explains that some people think violence is the only answer, but he will rely on diplomacy and peaceful means. He washes his hands of the Wheeler issue. A reporter asks if he's still running for the presidential nomination. Dilman replies that he is going to "fight like hell" to win the nomination over Eaton. To the tune of "Hail to the Chief," he is introduced to the convention delegates.

Cast
 James Earl Jones as Douglass Dilman
 Martin Balsam as Jim Talley
 Burgess Meredith as Senator Watson
 Lew Ayres as Noah Calvin
 William Windom as Arthur Eaton
 Barbara Rush as Kay Eaton
 Georg Stanford Brown as Robert Wheeler
 Janet MacLachlan as Wanda
 Patric Knowles as South African Consul
 Martin E. Brooks as Wheeler's lawyer
 Simon Scott as Hugh Gaynor

Reception

Critical response
Film critic Vincent Canby of The New York Times wrote in his review: "The Man, which opened yesterday at the Cinema I Theater, is the triumphantly short (93-minute) film version of Irving Wallace's almost endless (actually, 768-page) novel about the first black President of the United States. [...] At one time or another most of us have seen ceilings fall—in kitchens, in living rooms, in bathrooms—usually because of faulty plumbing. It's no fun and always a mess, with the plaster dust and all. But this one was obviously a whopper, being high and probably marble. It's an indication of the difficulty I had in relating to The Man that for the rest of the movie, which only exploits ceilings as melodramatic conveniences, I kept wondering what really happened. Hadn't anyone—the C.I.A. or somebody—checked out the palace? Had the Russians been fiddling around? Did a loo leak? I simply couldn't buy the casual explanation: 'Well, you know those old palaces, Jim.' About halfway through The Man, one comes to realize that, in its own unwitting way, the film is much more interested in contemplating incompetence than in presenting any ideas about politics, race relations, international diplomacy, personal ambition, courage, or what-have-you. [...] If The Man were a better movie, it might possibly be offensive. It isn't. It's silly and innocent, and when the band strikes up 'Hail to the Chief', it invites an idiotic tear. Rod Serling, who wrote the story and screenplay, has reworked and recut the original novel as if he were a tailor remodeling an old-fashioned suit to conform with current fashions, and Joseph Sargent, whose direction of The Forbin Project I admired, has made sure that it's all in focus."

Release
The Man was released in theatres on July 19, 1972.

See also
 List of American films of 1972

References

External links 
 
 

1972 films
1972 drama films
American political drama films
Films about race and ethnicity
Films based on American novels
Films directed by Joseph Sargent
Films set in Washington, D.C.
Paramount Pictures films
United States presidential succession in fiction
Films with screenplays by Rod Serling
Films scored by Jerry Goldsmith
Films about fictional presidents of the United States
Films based on works by Irving Wallace
1970s English-language films
1970s American films